Bryan Rust Young (born January 14, 1800, near Bardstown, Nelson County, Kentucky – May 14, 1882 in Elizabethtown, Kentucky) was an American Whig Party politician who served as a U.S. Representative from Kentucky, representing that state's 5th Congressional District for one term in the Twenty-ninth United States Congress, from 1845 to 1847. Young later served several terms in the Kentucky State House of Representatives between 1858 and 1864.

Young came from a political family, being the brother of William Singleton Young and an uncle to John Young Brown.

Outside of his political career, Young practiced medicine, having studied that subject at the University of Louisville. Young owned slaves.

References

External links

Information Please page on Bryan Rust Young

1800 births
1882 deaths
People from Nelson County, Kentucky
Whig Party members of the United States House of Representatives from Kentucky
Members of the Kentucky House of Representatives
Physicians from Kentucky
American slave owners
University of Louisville alumni